Mohican Township is one of the fifteen townships of Ashland County, Ohio, United States. The 2010 census found 2,033 people in the township, 1,471 of whom lived in the unincorporated portions of the township.

Geography
Located in the southeastern part of the county, it borders the following townships:
Perry Township - north
Chester Township, Wayne County - northeast corner
Plain Township, Wayne County - east
Clinton Township, Wayne County - southeast corner
Lake Township - south
Green Township - southwest corner
Vermillion Township - west
Montgomery Township - northwest corner

The village of Jeromesville is located in northwestern Mohican Township.

Name and history
Mohican Township was established in 1812. The Mahicans and other Indian tribes once lived within its borders.

It is the only Mohican Township statewide.

Government
The township is governed by a three-member board of trustees, who are elected in November of odd-numbered years to a four-year term beginning on the following January 1. Two are elected in the year after the presidential election and one is elected in the year before it. There is also an elected township fiscal officer, who serves a four-year term beginning on April 1 of the year after the election, which is held in November of the year before the presidential election. Vacancies in the fiscal officership or on the board of trustees are filled by the remaining trustees.

References

External links
County website

Townships in Ashland County, Ohio
1812 establishments in Ohio
Populated places established in 1812
Townships in Ohio